Ramadilla is a small town located off of route P-160 in the Region of Bio Bio, Chile. It is part of the Municipality of Arauco. The nearest town is Carampangue.

References 
Populated places in Arauco Province